The 1922 World Fencing Championships were held in Paris, France.

Medal summary

Men's events

References

1922 in French sport
F
Fencing
World Fencing Championships
1922 in Paris